Zachaenus carvalhoi is a species of frog in the family Cycloramphidae. It is endemic to southeastern Brazil and is known from the southern Espírito Santo and adjacent Minas Gerais.

Zachaenus carvalhoi inhabits leaf litter in the Atlantic rainforest biome. Males can be heard calling during rainy weather.

References

carvalhoi
Endemic fauna of Brazil
Amphibians of Brazil
Taxa named by Eugênio Izecksohn
Amphibians described in 1983
Taxonomy articles created by Polbot